Fuling North railway station is a railway station located in Fuling District, Chongqing, People's Republic of China, on the Yuli Railway which operated by China Railway Corporation. It opened in 2013.

Future
The railway station will be served by the Chongqing–Wanzhou high-speed railway which is expected to open in 2025.

References

Railway stations in Chongqing
Railway stations in China opened in 2013